Philip Michael Quartararo (born January 7, 1956) is an American music industry executive.  He is currently President and Chairman at The Hello Group, and has held positions as CEO at  Virgin Records, Warner Bros. Records and EMI, and has been involved in the careers of recording artists ranging from Linkin Park to Josh Groban to the Spice Girls. Quartararo is known as a defender of artist rights.  He has spoken out on the fight against music piracy and the need to restore the value of music.    Quartararo is regarded as one of the most promotion-minded executives  in the music business and is regarded as a thought leader on the subject of partnership between brands and artists.

Biography

Early life 
Quartararo was born in Brooklyn, New York. His work in the music business began at an early age, booking music acts out of his bedroom while he was still in high school. He attended Chaminade High School in Mineola, New York where he booked the sockhop bands. He attended Syracuse University where his college roommates were John Sykes and Rob Light. Sykes went on to become co-founder of MTV and VH1 Cable Networks as well as holding senior positions at record labels and radio broadcast networks. Light went on to become managing partner and head of music for CAA.

Quartararo began his career in the record industry as a local radio promotion manager for A&M Records from 1977 to 1981. He moved on to become a regional promotion manager for RCA Records from 1981 to 1983. His executive breakthrough came when he was hired as Senior VP Promotion and Marketing for Island Records from 1982 to 1986 where he was instrumental in breaking U2 in America.

Virgin Records America 
In 1986 Quartararo was recruited by Richard Branson as part of the team to launch Virgin Records America along with executives, Jordan Harris and Jeff Ayeroff. In 1992 he became President and CEO of Virgin Records America. At Virgin he was influential in the recording careers of Smashing Pumpkins, Lenny Kravitz, Paula Abdul, After 7, Rolling Stones, Janet Jackson and Ben Harper. He is credited with the marketing blitz that launched the Spice Girls in the U.S., the success of which brought him to the attention of Warner Bros. Records.

Warner Bros. Records 
In 1997, Quartararo was recruited as President Warner Bros. Records which was ranked #1 out of world’s largest record companies.   At Warner he worked with artists including Linkin Park, Josh Groban, Madonna, Stevie Nicks, Cher, Wilco, Eric Clapton, Red Hot Chili Peppers, Faith Hill, Goo Goo Dolls and Green Day.

EMI Music 

In 2002, Quartararo was hired to become Executive Vice President of EMI Music and President of EMI Marketing. Quartararo reorganized EMI, shifting its focus from sales and distribution to marketing. He directed the marketing and launch of recordings of Coldplay, Norah Jones, Keith Urban, Blake Shelton, Trace Adkins, RBD, Beach Boys as well as marketing the estate catalogs of Frank Sinatra, Beatles, Les Paul and Dean Martin.

Other endeavors 

In late 2007, Quartararo left EMI to work with start up companies focused on digital music distribution.  In 2009, he started his own firm, Tripod Partners which has worked with various music industry companies as Beta Records TV, global online talent search Avon Voices, Shazam music discovery app and Guvera music streaming service.  He is associated with the talent management firm The Collective and a principal in the consultancy QP2 Group. Quartararo also manages Yoshiki, singer-songwriter Brandon Howard, and heavy metal group XJapan. Quartararo was executive producer of the 8 hour PBS miniseries The Soundtrack of Our Lives . He also serviced as executive producer of the double Grammy award winning album, Les Paul And Friends: A Tribute To A Legend. At the 2013 Midem  conference, Quartararo was referenced by industry media for his observation, “The old record business didn’t get killed. It committed suicide. The industry didn’t listen to its consumers.”

Philanthropy 

Quartararo sits on the boards of the Grammy Foundation, City of Hope, Cedar Sinai, Recording Industry Association of America (RIAA), T J Martell Foundation, Pacific Science Center, State of California Board for Engineers and Surveyors and Syracuse University’s S.I. Newhouse School of Public Communications (Senior Board).

He has been recognized for his philanthropic contributions with awards including City of Hope's "Spirit of Life" Award, Russell Simmons Award for Diversity and Equality, the Vincent Testaverde Award for Spinal Injury, Sons of Italy Award and Syracuse University's “40 at 40” Award.

Music Industry Honors 
Quartararo was named by Billboard magazine as Music Executive of the Year (2001), and received the NARAS Governors Award.

References 

1955 births
Living people
American music industry executives
S.I. Newhouse School of Public Communications alumni
People from Brooklyn
American chief executives